Don Mescall is a singer and songwriter from County Limerick in Ireland.

Songwriting 
As a songwriter Don Mescall works alone and also collaborates with other artists/songwriters. In previous years he was based in Nashville.

Mescall has had songs recorded by a wide range of artists including Rascal Flatts, Clay Aiken, Backstreet Boys, Ronan Keating, Boyzone, Jaydee Bixby, Ramin Karimloo, Aslan, Garou, Geri Halliwell, Neal McCoy, Sharon Corr, Daniel Boys, Cliff Richard, and Richie Havens.

Mescall's song, "Secret Smile" was included on the Rascal Flatts album Still Feels Good which debuted at the No.1 position in the Billboard 200 album chart and the Billboard Country Chart. Weeks later the Backstreet Boys entered the Billboard 200 album charts at No. 7 with their album "Unbreakable" which featured Mescall's song, "Trouble Is". This meant Mescall had 2 songs featured on albums in the top ten of the Billboard 200 chart during the week of 17 November 2007. In more recent years Don has had six songs featured on Marina Kaye's "Fearless" Album which went triple platinum in France (2015). Mescall had a Number 1 Irish country single in 2016 with Nathan Carter's "Wanna dance" from the album "Staying up all night" on Decca records. 

He had a number 1 single again with (Nathan Carter)'s 'Livin' the Dream', He also achieved Number 1 in Irish Country charts in 2018 with (Nathan Carter)'s single "This song is for you " Also in 2017 Mescall had a number 1 song with "Angels in Chains" (Geri Halliwell); the single reached number one in Argentina, Peru, and Spain .

In February 2017 Mescall received an Irish World Lifetime Achievement Award for songwriting and production. He received the award for Songwriter of the Year at the Irish Post Country Music Awards 2017 on August 30, 2017.

After having success writing for other artists, Mescall released his own album ‘Lighthouse Keeper’, in November 2018. It debuted at #1 on the Irish Independent Album charts in November 2018

On August 16, 2019 'Live Long Rock & Roll' was released. It was a tribute single for Henry McCollough, written by Don Mescall and McCollough, and performed by a super band, the McCollough Fusileers. It was released on Ballywonderland records. The band featured Nick Mason on drums, Sir Paul McCartney on bass, Albert Lee on electric guitar, Chris Stainton on Hammond and keyboards, Gary Brooker with lead vocals, Paul Brady and Paul Carrick with backing vocals, Fiachra Trench on strings, and the London Community Gospel Choir as backing vocals. The song was mixed by Steve Lipson and produced by Mescall. The single was featured on the Ballywonderland album by Henry McCollough.

Early career 
Having played pubs and clubs around Ireland, Mescall landed the job of opening for Richie Havens at the Mean Fiddler in London. Mescall began his set with a new song, "Paradise". Havens liked the song so much that he recorded "Paradise" for his 2002 album "Wishing Well".

Mescall regularly tours in Ireland and the United Kingdom and plays some major festivals. He splits his time between the United Kingdom, Ireland, and the United States.

Personal life 
Don Mescall is originally from the parish of Ahane/Lisnagry in Co. Limerick. He has eight sisters and two brothers. He has also been a vegetarian for more than 20 years.

Discography

Recordings by Don Mescall 
 Sunset of Gold – EP
 Lucky Star – EP (2004)
 Last Chance – EP (2004)
 Left in L.A. – single (2005)
 You Don't Love Me – EP (2005)
 Innocent Run – album (2006)
 Fuel for the Fire – EP (2007)
 Lighthouse Keeper - album (2018)

Songwriting For Other Artists 
Mescall's songs feature on the following albums, selling more than four million records worldwide:

Compilations, soundtracks and DVDs

Eurosong 2011 
Mescall took part in the Irish Eurovision Song competition on a Late Late Show Eurosong Special on Friday 11 February 2011. Having been 'mentored' by Ronan Hardiman the pair co-wrote their entry for the competition, "Talking with Jennifer". They placed third with a total score of 68 points.

"The Voice of Ireland" 2012 
Mescall was invited to act as assistant coach on the new Irish TV production of "The Voice of Ireland" which was filmed in Dublin in November 2011. He assisted his friend and co-writer Sharon Corr while appearing on the show which aired at the end of January 2012.

References

External links 
Official website
AGR Television Records Record Label of Don Mescall (multi-lingual)
IN PROFILE: EUROSONG: DON MESCALL
Introducing Sharon's Assistant Coach Don Mescall
Top songwriter Mescall Forges His Own Path

Living people
Year of birth missing (living people)
Irish male singers
Irish songwriters